Purwokerto Train Station (PWT) is a large railway station located in West Purwokerto, Banyumas Regency, Central Java, Indonesia.

Geography 
The station is located at an altitude of 75 m.

It is the largest station under the management of PT Kereta Api Indonesia (Persero) Operation Area V Purwokerto.

As a large station, all trains that pass through the Prupuk-Kroya railway line must stop at this station.

Design 
The station has seven active lines. Line 2 is the main line / straight line for a single track from / to Kroya-Yogyakarta-Surabaya and also for the upstream double track (to Cirebon-Jakarta). Line 3 is straight line for downstream double path (from Cirebon-Jakarta), both of which serve as the arrival and departure routes of KA. Line 1 is used when line 2 and 3 are carrying a train. Lines 4-6 are usually for locomotive parking and railway circuit. From line 7 three additional lines access the locomotive depot and station located at the northwest of the station. All paths other than the lines connected with the dials are connected directly to the main line.

Locomotives 
CC201 and CC203 locomotives is not so much, Locomotive CC206 strengthens the Daop V railway fleet. Train trucks are used to store and maintain the railway circuit, especially the Daop V itself.

This station is the east end station of the double lane crossing south of Java Island which will connect Jakarta-Surabaya. With the double track, the Jakarta-Purwokerto route and vice versa can be reached for an average of five hours only.

History 
Purwokerto Station was built in 1917-1918 by the Staatsspoorwegen (SS) railway company. The older station in Purwokerto is in the town center, built by Serajoedal Stoomtram Maatschappij in 1893-1896. The station was built on the Cirebon-Kroya line. In 1923 Purwokerto Station was connected to Purwokerto Timur railway station, allowing travelers from Jakarta to connect to Wonosobo or Purbalingga. But unfortunately in 1980 the line was disabled.

Services 
The following is a list of train services at the Purwokerto Station

References

External links 

Banyumas Regency
Railway stations in Central Java